Vincent Lobo is a former Indian national level badminton player. He has won numerous local, state and national level titles. At the national level, he has won eight Indian badminton national championship titles over his career. 

His first two Indian national titles came in 1989 at Bangalore when he was 12 years old and coached by his father Derrick Lobo. Vincent won the Under 12 Boys Singles and Doubles Indian National titles, partnering Advait Maniar. 

During his teenage years he was coached by both Uday Pawar and Leroy D’sa and was consistently ranked nationally in the top 10 in his respective age groups in both the singles and doubles.

The next 2 Indian national titles came at the Under 22 Doubles Nationals in 1996 where he won the Boys Doubles partnering Sachin Ratti and Mixed Doubles partnering Larissa Sadarangani. 

At the senior level he was the Indian National Mens Doubles and Mixed Doubles Champion in both 1999 and 2001. The Mens doubles he partnered with Jaseel Ismail for both titles while in mixed doubles he partnered with Archana Deodar and Madhumita Bisht  respectively. 

In 2000 Vincent was part of the Indian Mens Badminton Team that qualified to play in the Thomas Cup finals. He partnered with Pullela Gopichand in doubles to clinch the crucial match to beat Thailand (3-1) and move India to the finals stage at Kuala Lumpur. India reached the finals stage after a gap of 12 years when taken there in 1988 led by the renowned Prakash Padukone. 
 
In addition to his multiple national championship titles  
he was the silver medalist in badminton at the 1998 Commonwealth Games in the Men's Team event.

In 2001 at the age of 23 years, Vincent decided to retire from competitive badminton to pursue his MBA studies in America and has settled in the Philadelphia Area.

Achievements

IBF International

References

Living people
Indian male badminton players
Indian national badminton champions
Commonwealth Games medallists in badminton
Commonwealth Games silver medallists for India
Badminton players at the 1998 Commonwealth Games
1977 births
Medallists at the 1998 Commonwealth Games